Per Eklund (born November 12, 1980 in Stockholm) is a retired Swedish Lightweight professional mixed martial artist. Eklund was the first Swedish fighter to compete in Ultimate Fighting Championship and also formerly competed for M-1 Global.

Mixed martial arts career

Early career
As one of the first successful mixed martial artists to come Sweden, Eklund is by many considered as a pioneer for Swedish MMA.  In 2002, he started out his professional career fighting on the smaller European circuit, with many wins and finishes to his credit, including winning and defending the Strike and submit lightweight title in 2007. He also competed in the Russian M-1 Global organisation.

Eklund also had a few fights on the international scene, for promotions lite Shooto in Japan and Canadian Bodog Fight. 
As of 2007 he had racked up a record of 13-2-1, including wins over former PRIDE- and future UFC veteran David Baron, future UFC veteran Tom Niinimäki and future WEC and Bellator MMA veteran Rafael Dias, before getting the call from the UFC.

Ultimate Fighting Championships
In 2008, Eklund became the first Swede to sign with the UFC. 
At UFC 80, he fought against Sam Stout and lost via unanimous decision. 
He was given another chance and went up against Samy Schiavo at UFC 89, who he defeated by rear naked choke. 
In his last fight for the promotion, he was defeated via TKO by his then undefeated opponent Evan Dunham at UFC 95.

Championships and accomplishments

Mixed martial arts
Strike and Submit
Strike and Submit Lightweight Championship (One time; first)
One successful title defense
FinnFight
FinnFight 6 Featherweight Tournament Winner
Viking Fight
Viking Fight 2 Lightweight Tournament Winner

Mixed martial arts record

|-
| Loss
| align=center| 14-5-1
| Thomas Hytten
| KO (punch)
| Vision FC 2 
| 
| align=center| 1
| align=center| 0:48
| Karlstad, Sweden
| 
|-
| Loss
| align=center| 14-4-1
| Evan Dunham
| TKO (punches)
| UFC 95
| 
| align=center| 1
| align=center| 2:14
| London, England
| 
|-
| Win
| align=center| 14-3-1
| Samy Schiavo
| Submission (rear naked choke)
| UFC 89
| 
| align=center| 3
| align=center| 1:47
| Birmingham, England
| 
|-
| Loss
| align=center| 13-3-1
| Sam Stout
| Decision (unanimous)
| UFC 80
| 
| align=center| 3
| align=center| 5:00
| Newcastle, England
| 
|-
| Win
| align=center| 13-2-1
| Rafael Dias
| Decision (unanimous)
| Bodog Fight: Vancouver
| 
| align=center| 3
| align=center| 5:00
| Vancouver, British Columbia, Canada
| 
|-
| Win
| align=center| 12-2-1
| Toni Talvitie
| Decision (unanimous)
| Shooto Finland: Bloodbath
| 
| align=center| 2
| align=center| 5:00
| Vantaa, Finland
| 
|-
| Win
| align=center| 11-2-1
| David Metcalf
| Submission (kimura)
| Strike and Submit 2
| 
| align=center| 2
| align=center| 3:26
| Gateshead, England
| 
|-
| Win
| align=center| 10-2-1
| Aaron Barrow
| Submission (kimura)
| Strike and Submit 1
| 
| align=center| 1
| align=center| 1:19
| Gateshead, England
| 
|-
| Loss
| align=center| 9-2-1
| Tatsuya Kawajiri
| TKO (punches)
| Shooto: Champion Carnival
| 
| align=center| 1
| align=center| 4:10
| Yokohama, Japan
| 
|-
| Win
| align=center| 9-1-1
| David Baron
| Decision (unanimous)
| European Vale Tudo 6 - Ragnarok
| 
| align=center| 3
| align=center| 5:00
| Stockholm, Sweden
| 
|-
| Loss
| align=center| 8-1-1
| Yuri Ivlev
| Decision (unanimous)
| M-1 MFC: Russia vs. Europe
| 
| align=center| 2
| align=center| 5:00
| St. Petersburg, Russia
| 
|-
| Win
| align=center| 8-0-1
| Chico Martinez
| Submission (armbar)
| Rings Muay Thai
| 
| align=center| 1
| align=center| N/A
| Enschede, Netherlands
| 
|-
| Win
| align=center| 7-0-1
| Mikhail Rosokhaty
| Submission (armbar)
| WFCA: Latvia Free Fight 2 
| 
| align=center| 1
| align=center| N/A
| Riga, Latvia
| 
|-
| Win
| align=center| 6-0-1
| Colin Mannsur
| KO (knees)
| Together Productions: Fight Gala
| 
| align=center| N/A
| align=center| N/A
| Netherlands
| 
|-
| Draw
| align=center| 5-0-1
| Thomas Hytten
| Draw
| Shooto Finland: Cold War
| 
| align=center| 2
| align=center| 5:00
| Turku, Finland
| 
|-
| Win
| align=center| 5-0
| Teemu Nurkkala
| TKO (punches)
| FinnFight 6
| 
| align=center| 1
| align=center| 0:35
| Turku, Finland
| Won FF 6 Featherweight Tournament.
|-
| Win
| align=center| 4-0
| Tom Niinimäki
| TKO (punches)
| FinnFight 6
| 
| align=center| 1
| align=center| 3:53
| Turku, Finland
| 
|-
| Win
| align=center| 3-0
| Tchavdar Pavlov
| Submission (triangle choke)
| Viking Fight 2: The Modern Gladiators
| 
| align=center| 1
| align=center| N/A
| Broendby, Denmark
| Won VF 2 Lightweight Tournament.
|-
| Win
| align=center| 2-0
| Karim Sorensen
| Submission (armbar)
| Viking Fight 2: The Modern Gladiators
| 
| align=center| 1
| align=center| N/A
| Broendby, Denmark
| 
|-
| Win
| align=center| 1-0
| Ilya Kudryashov
| Decision (split)
| M-1 MFC: European Championship 2002
| 
| align=center| 2
| align=center| 5:00
| St. Petersburg, Russia
|

Professional boxing record

| style="text-align:center;" colspan="8"|1 Win (0 knockouts, 1 decision),  0 Losses
|-
|align=center style="border-style: none none solid solid; background: #e3e3e3"|Res.
|align=center style="border-style: none none solid solid; background: #e3e3e3"|Record
|align=center style="border-style: none none solid solid; background: #e3e3e3"|Opponent
|align=center style="border-style: none none solid solid; background: #e3e3e3"|Type
|align=center style="border-style: none none solid solid; background: #e3e3e3"|Rd., Time
|align=center style="border-style: none none solid solid; background: #e3e3e3"|Date
|align=center style="border-style: none none solid solid; background: #e3e3e3"|Location
|align=center style="border-style: none none solid solid; background: #e3e3e3"|Notes
|-align=center
|Win
|align=center|1-0||align=left| Lloyd Hollard
|MD
|4 (4)
|2007-09-28
|align=left| Kungliga Tennishallen, Stockholm, Sweden
|align=left|
|-align=center

References

External links
 
 

Living people
1980 births
Swedish male mixed martial artists
Lightweight mixed martial artists
Swedish male boxers
Swedish practitioners of Brazilian jiu-jitsu
Sportspeople from Stockholm
Featherweight mixed martial artists
Welterweight mixed martial artists
Mixed martial artists utilizing boxing
Mixed martial artists utilizing Brazilian jiu-jitsu
Ultimate Fighting Championship male fighters